is an indoor sporting arena located in Okayama, Japan. The capacity of the arena is 11,000 spectators. It host the home matches of the Okayama Seagulls of the V.League.

External links
Venue information

Basketball venues in Japan
Indoor arenas in Japan
Sports venues in Okayama Prefecture
Sport in Okayama
Tryhoop Okayama